Live Loudest at the Budokan '91 is the eight live album by the Japanese heavy metal band Loudness. It was released at the end of 2009 as a package of a CD and a DVD, with recordings and footage from a concert held in Tokyo Budokan during the 1991 tour to promote the On the Prowl album, with Mike Vescera on vocals.

Track listing
CD
"Down 'n' Dirty" - 5:00
"Playin' Games" - 5:13
"In the Mirror" - 3:43
"Never Again" - 5:44
"Crazy Night" - 4:32
"So Lonely" - 5:33
"Crazy Doctor" - 6:04
"Loudness" - 8:26
"Find a Way" - 8:55
"Sleepless Night" - 7:40
"Soldier of Fortune" - 4:29
"Slap in the Face" (bonus studio track) - 5:14

DVD
"Love Toys"
"Take It or Leave It"
"Never Again"
"Sleepless Night"
"Down 'n' Dirty" (music video)
"In the Mirror" (music video)
"You Shook Me" (music video)

Personnel
Loudness
Mike Vescera – vocals
Akira Takasaki – guitars
Masayoshi Yamashita – bass
Munetaka Higuchi – drums

Additional musicians
Kosuke Oshima - keyboards

Production
Bill Freesh - engineer, mixing
Isao Kikuchi - mastering
Jeff Sato - supervisor

References

2009 live albums
Loudness (band) live albums
Live video albums
2009 video albums
Warner Music Group live albums
Warner Music Group video albums
Albums recorded at the Nippon Budokan